The 1910–11 season was Galatasaray SK's 7th in existence and the club's 5th consecutive season in the IFL. Galatasaray won the league for the third time.

Squad statistics

Competitions

Istanbul Football League

Classification

Matches
Kick-off listed in local time (EEST)

Friendly Matches

References
 Tuncay, Bülent (2002). Galatasaray Tarihi. Yapı Kredi Yayınları 
 1910-1911 İstanbul Futbol Ligi. Türk Futbol Tarihi vol.1. page(31). (June 1992) Türkiye Futbol Federasyonu Yayınları.
 Atabeyoğlu, Cem. 1453-1991 Türk Spor Tarihi Ansiklopedisi. page(60).(1991) An Grafik Basın Sanayi ve Ticaret AŞ
 Şenol, Mehmet. First trip to Europe. Galatasaray Magazine, August 2011, page 70-73.

External links
 Galatasaray Sports Club Official Website 
 Turkish Football Federation - Galatasaray A.Ş. 
 uefa.com - Galatasaray AŞ

Galatasaray S.K. (football) seasons
Turkish football clubs 1910–11 season
1910s in Istanbul